Mayurhat is a village under Ranaghat subdivision in Nadia district, West Bengal, India.

Geography

Mayurhat is in the middle of Bagula and Taraknagar. It is in under Hanskhali police station.

Transport
The main transport is the railway service. Mayurhat railway station is situated on the Ranaghat-Gede branch line of the Sealdah railway division. Number of local trains stop at Mayurhat.

Education

There is one high school and more than 4 primary schools.

Festivals

Charak mala, Rath Yatra are the festivals organised in the village as well as the football and the cricket tournaments.

Myths  
There is an old story about a box which held 1001 evil spirits and which was guarded by an old sage who could guard it no longer. He entrusted the box to the village of Mayurhat to keep watch on for all time. During the 101st year a demon tricked the guards and opened the box releasing all of the evil spirits. A young man shut the box just in time. It turns out that there was also a good spirit inside which was called Hope and the young man smiled at that reflecting on hope.

References

Villages in Nadia district